József Zilisy, also known as Giuseppe Zilizzi or Joseph Zilizzi (21 February 1899 – 2 March 1982) was a Hungarian-Italian footballer and football manager.

References
 Alain Pécheral, La grande histoire de l'OM, Éditions L'Équipe, p. 474

External links
Manager profile
Hungarian players in Italy, RSSSF

1899 births
Hungarian footballers
Hungarian expatriate footballers
Hungarian expatriate sportspeople in Italy
Ferencvárosi TC footballers
A.C. Milan players
Expatriate footballers in Italy
Serie A players
Hungarian football managers
Olympique de Marseille managers
Benevento Calcio managers
A.C. Carpi managers
1982 deaths
Association football forwards
Footballers from Budapest